Setenay Özbek (born 1961, in Istanbul, Turkey) is a Turkish-born artist, writer, and documentary filmmaker. Özbek is of Ubykh descent.

Biography
Özbek was born in 1961 in Istanbul, Turkey and she attended Erenköy Girls High School. In 1990, she graduated from Marmara University, within the Faculty of Fine Arts in the Department of Performing Arts.

From 1983 to 1986, Özbek studied art informally at the "Istasyon Fine Art Academy", under the tutelage of several artists, Sabri Berkel, Hülya Düzenli, Erkan Özdilek and Ergül Özkutan. Her abstract expressionist paintings are created in both acrylic and oil paint, they have a bold appearance due to the contrasting colours and shapes. Since 1986, Özbek went on to branch out into documentary filmmaking.

In 2009, she was awarded first prize for the Bakrac Art Gallery 30th Year Painting Competition. In 2009, Fifth Tashkent Biennale of Contemporary Art, "The 3rd Runner up".

She is a member of International PEN Association of Writers and International Association of Art (A.I.A.A) to the United Nations Educational, Scientific and Cultural Organization (UNESCO).

In 2015, Özbek moved to the seaside town of Bodrum, Turkey and opened an art school for local children.

Filmography

Select art exhibitions

Solo exhibitions
 2019	"Selection", Gallery Binyıl - Hamam Arts Hub HAH, Kuruçeşme, Istanbul, Turkey
 2017	"Performance Artist", International Ataşehir Municipality Festival, Istanbul, Turkey
 2017	"Selection", Frankie Istanbul, Sofa Hotel, Istanbul, Turkey
 2016	"Imaginary Transformation", Kent Art Gallery, Ankara, Turkey
 2014	 "Inner Reminiscences", Anna Laudel Art Gallery, Istanbul, Turkey
 2014 - "Inner Reminiscences", Art 350 Gallery, Istanbul, Turkey
 2012 - "Inner Reminiscences", Berze Collectibles, Istanbul, Turkey
 2012 - "Without Borders", Art 350 Gallery, Istanbul, Turkey
 2011 - Gallery Espas, Istanbul, Turkey
 2010 – TIGGES, Rechtsanwälte, Düsseldorf, Germany
 2010 - Bakrac Art Gallery, Istanbul, Turkey
 2009 - "Across Land And Time" International Art Studio "Radovan Trnavac Mica", Valjevo, Serbia
 2009 - “Cosmos” Rep. of Turkey, Ministry of Foreign Affairs, Suna Çokgür Ilıcak Art Gallery, Ankara, Turkey
 2008 - "Cosmos", Austria Consulate General Culture Office, Istanbul, Turkey
 2008 - "Dedicated to the Moment" Gallery Binyil, Istanbul, Turkey
 2007 - "Sincerity" Gallery Artist, Istanbul, Turkey
 2007 – "Inner Reminiscences" Gallery-A, Istanbul, Turkey
 2006 – 6. Ankara Fine Arts Fair, Gallery Binyil, Ankara, Turkey
 2006 – İş Bankası Art Gallery, Izmir, Turkey
 2005 – Ankara Fine Arts Fair, Galeri X, Ankara, Turkey
 2005 – Art Istanbul 2005, Istanbul, Turkey

Group exhibitions
 2021 - Merqez Art Space, Bodrum Marina Yacht Club, Bodrum
 2021 - Contemporary Istanbul (Fall), Gallery Binyıl Parallel Exhibition, Istanbul, Turkey
 2021 - Artcontact İstanbul, Tabularasa Transnational Art, Istanbul, Turkey
 2021 - Contemporary Istanbul (Spring), Gallery Binyıl, Istanbul, Turkey
 2020 - Contemporary Istanbul, Gallery Binyıl, Istanbul, Turkey  
 2019 - Ramart Platform, Turkish and Islamic Art Museum, Istanbul, Turkey
 2019 - "Global Views Istanbul", Nişantaşı, Istanbul, Turkey https://globalviews.consulting/representing/#Setenay    
 2019 - 40 Artists, İstinye Park, Istanbul, Turkey
 2018 - "Blue and Green", 20 Artists Exhibition, Alta Sanat, Bodrum, Turkey
 2018 - Merey Collection Exhibition, Tophane-i Amire, Tophane, İstanbul, Turkey
 2017 - Florence Biennale XI, Florence, Italy
 2017 - Galleria Luz de la Vida, Malaga, Spain
 2016 - In Honor of Barış Manço, Beşiktaş Municipality Gallery, Beşiktaş, Istanbul, Turkey
 2014 - "War, Exile, Life" – KAFDAV, Gallery Uray, Çankaya Municipality, Ankara, Turkey
 2013 - "9 artist / 9 works", Delegation of Turkey to the EU, Brussel, Belgium
 2013 - "Free and 90, Republic Exhibition", Embassy of the Republic of Turkey , Berlin, Germany
 2011 - Citibank A.Ş. and Gallery Espas, Citigold Select, Levent, Istanbul, Turkey
 2011 - K.T.O. Konya Karatay University 1st International Art, Culture, Science Days, Konya, Turkey
 2011 - Izmir 1st International Art Biennale, Izmir, Turkey
 2011 - IROK Gallery, Horst, Netherlands
 2010 - "Power of Dynamism", Gallery Binyıl, Istanbul, Turkey 
 2010 - WALL FOR PEACE – W - AFPIAAP, Sanski, Sarajevo, Bosnia and Herzegovina
 2010 - "FEED_BACK," group exhibition, Los Angeles Center for Digital Art (LACDA), Los Angeles, California, United States, curated by: Roxanne Brousseau-Félio
 2010 - "Comparison of Tomorrow in Turkey", Beşiktaş Art Gallery, Istanbul, Turkey
 2010 - Fourth International Art Forum, Sharm El Sheikh, Egypt
 2010 - Egypt Culture Centre, Istanbul, Turkey
 2009 - 5th Tashkent International Biennale of Contemporary Art, Uzbekistan
 2008 - "October Passage VII", Istanbul Technical University (ITU) Maslak, Istanbul
 2008 - 3rd International Art Festival, Dryanovo, Bulgaria
 2007 - International Art Camp, group exhibition and art auction, Association Saint Henri, Toulouse, France
 2007 - "Uchisar Group Exhibition", French Cultural Association, Istanbul, Turkey
 2007 - Adana Caucasian Culture Association, Adana, Turkey
 2007 - INTES Art Gallery, Ankara, Turkey
 2007 – "Caucasian Art and Cultural Heritage", Belgian North Caucasian Association, MuHKa Museum, Belgium
 2007 – International Art Symposium and Group Exhibition, in Uchisar and Istanbul, Turkey
 2007 – Baglarbasi Caucasian Culture Association, Istanbul / Turkey
 2006 – Adana Caucasian Culture Association "An Invitation For The Peace", Adana / Turkey
 2006 – 238th Summer Exhibition, Royal Academy of Arts, London, England (shortlisted)
 2005 – Mersin University  "October Passage IV", Mersin / Turkey

Bibliography

See also
 List of Turkish painters
 List of Turkish writers

References

External links
 Official Site of Setenay Özbek
 

1961 births
Living people
20th-century Turkish women artists
21st-century Turkish women artists
Artists from Istanbul
Marmara University alumni
Turkish women painters
Turkish writers
Turkish people of Circassian descent
Erenköy Girls High School alumni